The common iliac lymph nodes, four to six in number, are grouped behind and on the sides of the common iliac artery, one or two being placed below the bifurcation of the aorta, in front of the fifth lumbar vertebra.

They drain chiefly the hypogastric and external iliac glands, and their efferents pass to the lateral aortic glands.

References 

Lymphatics of the torso